Hope, previously known as Hope Center, is a hamlet located in the Town of Hope in Hamilton County, New York, United States. The hamlet  stretches for approximately one mile along New York State Route 30 on the eastern bank of the Sacandaga River.

References

Hamlets in Hamilton County, New York
Hamlets in New York (state)